The Wolf is a 1914 American silent drama film directed by Barry O'Neil, based on the play of the same name by Eugene Walter.  The film stars Bernard Siegel, Ruth Bryan, and George Soule Spencer.

Cast list
 Bernard Siegel as Baptiste Le Grand
 Ruth Bryan as Annette
 George Soule Spencer as Jules Beaubien
 Ferdinand Tidmarsh as McDonald, "the Wolf"
 Gaston Bell as McDonald's assistant
 Joe Kaufman
 Charles Brandt
 Edwin Barbour
 Richard Wangemann
 Mart Heisey

References

1914 drama films
1910s English-language films
American black-and-white films
Films directed by Barry O'Neil
1910s American films